The following list of foreign correspondents in the Spanish Civil War is an alphabetical list of the large number of journalists and photographers who were in Spain at some stage of the Spanish Civil War (1936–1939). It only includes those who were specifically accredited as such, as opposed to writers who later wrote of their experiences, including Gustav Regler, George Orwell, and so on.

Foreign press coverage of the war was extensive, with around a thousand foreign newspaper correspondents working from Spain.

Some journalists wrote for more than one newspaper and several papers had more than one journalist in Spain at the same time or at different times. In some cases, they were already seasoned war correspondents when they went to Spain. A few of them, such as Jay Allen, were already living in Spain when war broke out, and some of them, again like Allen, who wrote at various times for the Chicago Daily Tribune, News Chronicle, and The New York Times, wrote for more than one paper.

While some correspondents supported the rebel cause, most notably William Carney, Edward Knoblaugh]and H. R. Knickerbocker, according to the Hispanist Paul Preston, "The bulk of the reporters became so committed to the Republic, partly because of the horrible things they saw such as the bombing of civilians, but even more so because they felt that what was going on in Spain was everybody's fight."

A case in point was that of Louis Delaprée, a Catholic correspondent sent to cover the rebel zone for Paris-Soir, who was killed as a result of his plane being shot down on his way back to Paris, furious at his newspaper not publishing his articles, as it clearly considered the "massacre of a hundred Spanish children is less interesting than a sigh from Mrs Simpson."

Another, even more Catholic, correspondent was Noel Monks, an Australian journalist for the Daily Express, who had initially been sympathetic to Franco, wrote critically of the "so-called British experts" who would later visit Guernica and "deliver pompous judgements: 'Guernica was set on fire by the Reds,' My answer to them is unprintable... If the 'Reds' had destroyed Guernica, I for one could have blown the whole story... And how I would have blown it had it been true!"

Journalists

A 
James Abbe
Barbro Alving (Bang) – Dagens Nyheter
Jay Allen – the Chicago Tribune and News Chronicle

B 
Sam Baron – Socialist Call
Vernon Bartlett – News Chronicle
Georges Berniard – Le Petit Gironde
Daniel Berthet
 Burnett Bolloten – Associated Press or United Press
Franz Borkenau – London Daily Express, Austrian journalist who went on to write The Spanish Cockpit
Georges Botto – Havas Agency
Rene Brut
Henry Buckley – Daily Telegraph and the Observer
M. J. Buckley – Cork Examiner

C 
Harold Cardozo – Daily Mail 
William P. Carney – was one of the New York Times correspondents reporting from the Nationalist side.
Claud Cockburn (under the pseudonym Frank Pitcairn) – Daily Worker and The Week
Mathieu Corman – Ce Soir
Félix Correia – the Portuguese Diario de Lisboa
Virginia Cowles – Hearst Publications
Geoffrey Cox – News Chronicle and the Daily Express

D 
Marcel Dany
Frances Davis – Chicago Daily News
Louis Delaprée – Paris-Soir 
Sefton Delmer – London Daily Express 
Jean D’Hospital – Havas Agency
Shiela Grant Duff – Chicago Daily News

F 
Ladislas Farago – New York Times
Lawrence A. Fernsworth – New York Times. He also wrote for The Times and America
Louis Fischer – New York's The Nation and London's New Statesman and Nation 
Lionel Fleming – Irish Times
Charles Foltz – Associated Press
William Forrest – Daily Express

G 
Gertrude Gaffney – Irish Independent 
O. D. Gallagher – London Daily Express
Cecil Gerahty – Special Correspondent for the Daily Mail
Martha Gellhorn – Collier's Weekly, accompanied by her future husband Ernest Hemingway
Floyd Gibbons – International News Service
Jędrzej Giertych - Kurjer Poznański
Henry Tilton 'Hank' Gorrell – United Press
Gerda Grepp – Arbeiderbladet
Nordahl Grieg

H 
Frank Hanighen – the Daily Express 
Ernest Hemingway – North American Newspaper Alliance
Pierre Héricourt – Action Française
William Hillman – Hearst Press correspondent 
James Holburn – temporary correspondent for The Times with the Nationalist forces
Christopher Holme  – Reuters 
Langston Hughes reported from the Abraham Lincoln Brigade for the Baltimore Afro-American

J 
Frank Jellinek – Manchester Guardian
Bradish Johnson – Newsweek and The Spur, killed by an exploding shell near Teruel,
Bertrand de Jouvenel – Paris-Soir

K 
Peter Kerrigan – Daily Worker
Frank L. Kluckhohn was one of the New York Times correspondents reporting from the Nationalist side.
H. R. Knickerbocker (Pulitzer Prize-winner)  – the Hearst Press correspondent 
H. Edward Knoblaugh – Associated Press
Arthur Koestler – News Chronicle and Pester Lloyd 
Mikhail Koltsov for Pravda

L 
John Langdon-Davies – News Chronicle
Roman Lechter – Polish Naje Presse  
Lise Lindbæk – Dagbladet
Rupert Lockwood was the accredited correspondent for the Melbourne Herald

M 
Gault MacGowan – New York Sun 
Henri Malet-Dauban Havas Agency
Richard Massock – Associated Press 
Max Massot – Le Journal
Herbert Matthews was the New York Times correspondent on the Republican side
Francis McCullagh – Irish Independent
Webb Miller – United Press 
James M. Minifie – New York Herald-Tribune 
Noel Monks – London Daily Express
Indro Montanelli for Il Messaggero
Alan Moorehead – London Daily Express
Curio Mortari – La Stampa

N 
Edward J. (Eddie) Neil – Associated Press, killed by an exploding shell near Teruel, December 1937
Mário Neves – the Portuguese Diario de Lisboa – Neves entered Badajoz after the fall of the city in the early morning of 15 August, together with Daniel Berthet and Marcel Dany. 
Robert Neville – the New York Herald-Tribune
Joseph North – Daily Worker and New Masses
Leopoldo Nunes – O Século

P 
Eleanor Packard – United Press
Reynolds Packard – New York Herald-Tribune
Irving Pflaum
Kim Philby – The Times''' accredited special correspondent with the Nationalist forces
Percival Phillips– The Daily Telegraph Ksawery Pruszyński - Wiadomości Literackie R 
Gustav Regler – Deutsche Zentral-Zeitung 
F. A. Rice – the Morning PostKarl Robson – Daily ExpressEdwin Rolfe – Daily Worker and New MassesEsmond Romilly – News ChronicleKajsa Rothman – Karlstads-Tidningen S 
Cedric Salter – Daily Telegraph, News Chronicle and Daily MailVictor Schiff – Daily HeraldK. Scott-Watson SEE Keith Scott Watson
George Seldes – New York PostErnest Sheepshanks – Reuters, killed by an exploding shell near Teruel,
Alex Small  – the Chicago TribuneSidney Smith – Daily ExpressGeorge Steer, of The Times witnessed and reported on the bombing of Guernica. Left to join The Daily TelegraphWilliam F. Stirling was a temporary correspondent for The Times.
Leland Stowe – Herald TribuneJoseph Swire
Roland Strunk – Völkischer BeobachterVratislav Šantroch – Rudé právoSzmul Sznejderman - Hajnt T 
Nigel Tangye – the Evening NewsEdmond Taylor – Chicago TribuneSimone Téry - French journalist for Regards 

 V 
Ferenc Vajta

 W 
Keith Scott Watson – Daily Herald and The StarDennis Weaver – News ChronicleJohn T. Whitaker – New York Herald TribuneKarl H. Von Wiegand – International News Service
Elizabeth Wilkinson – Daily WorkerTom Wintringham – the Daily Worker and Picture Post Y 
 Jan H. Yindrich United Press

 Z 
Lester Ziffren –  United Press

 Photographers 
Photographers included Robert Capa, Gerda Taro (who died at Brunete in July 1937), David Seymour, Hans Namuth, and Georg Reisner. Major clients were photojournalistic magazines such as Vu, Life and Picture Post. Vu would be the first to publish Capa's famous photograph of Federico Borrell García, known as The Falling Soldier.
Three boxes containing 4,500 lost negatives taken by Taro, Capa, and Seymour during the war were rediscovered in 2007. The documentary film The Mexican Suitcase (2011) tells the story of the negatives, which are currently housed at the International Center of Photography in New York.

 Incidents involving correspondents 
 Gerda Taro dies on 26 July 1937, after an "accident" during the  battle of Brunete, Spain
 In December 1937, near Teruel, a shell exploded just in front of the car in which Kim Philby, The Times' accredited special correspondent with the Nationalist forces, was travelling with the correspondents Edward J. (Eddie) Neil of Associated Press, Bradish Johnson of Newsweek'', and Ernest Sheepshanks of Reuters. While Philby suffered only a minor head wound, Johnson was killed outright, and Neil and Sheepshanks soon died of their wounds.

References

 
Lists of journalists
Spanish Civil War-related lists
Foreign correspondents